Damansara Perdana is an affluent township in Petaling Jaya, Selangor, Malaysia. It is located 10 minutes away from the city of Kuala Lumpur.

History
Damansara Perdana used to be an Orang Asli village until developer MK Land Saujana Triangle Sdn Bhd bought most of it over and started developing it in 1996. Since then, Damansara Perdana has become one of the best selling township in Petaling Jaya with total sales exceeding RM1.9 billion.

The  Damansara Perdana is located within the Golden Triangle of Petaling Jaya, which also consists of Bandar Utama and Mutiara Damansara. It is accessible via the Damansara–Puchong Expressway, SPRINT Highway (Penchala Link), Persiaran Surian, and NKVE. 

Businesses include 1 Utama, IKEA, The Curve, Tesco and Cathay Cineleisure. Mixed developments include CF i.e. Perdana View condo and service apartments, Damansara Perdana Emerald condo and service apartments, The Place, Perdana Business Centre, and the Armanee Terrace Condominiums.
 
Most recently Mammoth Empire Land Sdn. Bhd. had developed a joint development project with MKLAND Holdings Bhd. to develop the Empire Damansara project, which consists of Empire City and Empire Residence. Another developer, Tujuan Gemilang Sdn. Bhd. had also developed a few projects in Damansara Perdana, namely the PJ Trade Centre and Point 92.

Completion dates for the projects in Damansara Perdana
 The Place – 2000
 Perdana Trade Centre – 2000
 Perdana Emerald Condo - Block 1 & 2 – 2002/ Block 3 – 2005
 Perdana View Condo – August 2004
 Flora Damansara – 2005
 Perdana Exclusive Condo – 2005
 Ritze Perdana 1 – 2006
 Metropolitan square – Phase 1 – January 2007/ Phase 2 – July 2013 (est.)
 Armanee Terrace I – 2008
 PJ Trade Center – February 2009
 Armanee Terrace II – March 2017
 Ritze Perdana 2 – 2010
 Rafflesia – 2011
 Empire Residence – Early 2012
 Neo Damansara Residence – Late 2012
 Point 92 – 2012
 Empire Damansara – 2013
 ForestHill Damansara - 2013
 Empire City - Pending
 ForestHill Residence - Pending

Location
Damansara Perdana is part of the Golden Triangle of Petaling Jaya, one of the exclusive and affluent suburbs situated in the Klang Valley, at Selangor, Malaysia. As one of the biggest developments in Petaling Jaya, this township is serviced by the Damansara–Puchong Expressway (LDP), the New Klang Valley Expressway (NKVE), and the Sprint Expressway (Penchala Link). With the opening of the 24 million ringgit direct-connection to the SPRINT highway (Penchala Link), traveling to Kuala Lumpur City Centre takes about 7 minutes to reach Jalan Tuanku Abdul Halim (Jalan Duta). It is also 5 minutes to Mont' Kiara via the SPRINT highway (Penchala Link).

Damansara Perdana is surrounded by major affluent townships within 10 km radius such as Mutiara Damansara, Bandar Sri Damansara, Taman Tun Dr. Ismail, Bandar Utama, Damansara Utama and Damansara Jaya.

References

External links
 
 Damansara Perdana Blog

Townships in Selangor